CK Asset Holdings Limited, previously known as Cheung Kong Property Holdings Limited, is a property developer registered in the Cayman Islands, with its headquarters and principal place of business in Hong Kong.

History
The company was established in 2015 when Cheung Kong Holdings spun off its property holdings into a separate company as part of a restructuring. CK Asset Holdings began trading on 3 June 2015. After restructuring, Cheung Kong Holdings and Hutchison Whampoa went private, replacing their major listed companies with CK Hutchison Holdings and CK Asset Holdings.

Immediately after restructuring, CK Asset Holdings became a constituent of the Hang Seng Index (the blue-chip index of the Hong Kong stock exchange).

In 2019 the company announced the takeover of the UK pub company Greene King.

Chairmen

List of chairmen 

 Li Ka-shing (1950–2018)
 Victor Li (2018– )

List of senior advisors 

 Li Ka-shing (2018– )

References

External links

 

Land developers of Hong Kong
CK Hutchison Holdings
Companies listed on the Hong Kong Stock Exchange
2015 establishments in Hong Kong